Here follows a list of notable alumni and faculty of Harvey Mudd College, Claremont, California, United States.

Notable alumni

Academia
 Jerrold B. Tunnell, 1972, mathematician
 Karl Mahlburg, 2001, mathematician
 Robert L. Smith, 1966, engineer

Astronauts and aeronautics
 Stan Love, 1987, astronaut, crew member for Space Shuttle Atlantis STS-122, "capcom" or communications officer with the International Space Station
 George "Pinky" Nelson, 1972, astronaut, flew on three Space Shuttle program missions, second American to walk in space without a tether to a spacecraft

Entertainment
 Michael G. Wilson, 1963, producer of the James Bond series of films
 Sean Plott, 2008, professional StarCraft player and commentator who represented the United States in the 2004 and 2005 World Cyber Games Grand Finals; won the 2007 WCG Pan American Championship
 Scott Stokdyk, 1991, Academy Award winner for best visual effects for Spider-Man 2; Visual Effects Supervisor at Sony Pictures Imageworks;
 Gregory Rae, 2000, Producer at Martian Entertainment LLC. Notable productions include Hedwig and the Angry Inch (2014 Tony Award), Kinky Boots (2013 Tony Award, 2016 Olivier Award), and The Normal Heart (2011 Tony Award).
 Michael Tapper, 2000, former member of the band We Are Scientists

Software and engineering
 Donald D. Chamberlin, 1966, co-inventor of SQL (database query language) and IBM representative to the working group developing the XQuery language
 Tom Preston-Werner (drop out), co-founder of GitHub, creator of Gravatar
 Jonathan Gay, 1989, creator of Adobe Flash software
 Joseph Costello, 1974, chairman and CEO of think3, former president and CEO of Cadence Design Systems
 Ned Freed, 1982, co-author of the MIME email standard (RFCs 2045-2049)
 Robert Freitas, 1974, Feynman Prize in Nanotechnology (2009)
 Nabeel Gareeb, CEO of MEMC Electronic Materials, Inc.; sixth highest paid CEO in 2007 (with a salary of $79.6 million)
 Dominic Mazzoni, 1999, creator of the Audacity sound editing program
 Bruce Nelson, 1974 (deceased), inventor of the remote procedure call for computer communications
 Sage Weil, 2000, co-founder of WebRing, DreamHost, Inktank, and Ceph

Politics
 Richard H. Jones, 1972, former US Ambassador to Israel, Kuwait, Kazakhstan, Lebanon, and Chief Policy Officer and Deputy Administrator of the Coalition Provisional Authority in Iraq
 Amanda Simpson, 1983, Executive Director of the Army Energy Initiatives Task Force, Department of Defense

Business
 Eric B. Kim, 1976, chief marketing officer of Intel, former CMO of Samsung Electronics

Miscellaneous
 Joe Pelton, 2000, professional poker player, winner of 2006 Legends of Poker tournament

Notable faculty
William B. Allen
Arthur T. Benjamin, mathematician known for his mental math-based "mathemagics" performances featured in various TED talks and other media outlets
Nathaniel Davis
Weiqing Gu
President Maria Klawe
Ran Libeskind-Hadas
Lisette de Pillis
Nick Pippenger
Francis Su
Talithia Williams

References

Harvey Mudd College people